The Armed Forces of Equatorial Guinea consists of approximately 2,500 service members. The army has almost 1,400 soldiers, the police 400 paramilitary men, the navy 200 service members, and the air force about 120 members. There is also a gendarmerie, but the number of members is unknown. The Gendarmerie is a new branch of the service in which training and education is being supported by the French Military Cooperation in Equatorial Guinea. Military appointments are all reviewed by President Teodoro Obiang, and few of the native militiamen come from outside of Obiang's Mongomo-based Esangui clan. Obiang was a general when he overthrew his uncle, Francisco Macías Nguema.

Overall the military is poorly trained and equipped. It has mostly small arms, RPGs, and mortars. Almost none of its Soviet-style light-armored vehicles or trucks are operational.

History

The Armed Forces were reorganized in 1979. In 1988, the United States donated a 68-foot patrol boat to the Equatoguinean navy to patrol its exclusive economic zone. The U.S. patrol boat Isla de Bioko is no longer operational. U.S. military-to-military engagement has been dormant since 1997 (the year of the last Joint Combined Exchange Training exercise). Between 1984 and 1992, service members went regularly to the United States on the International Military Education Training program, after which funding for this program for Equatorial Guinea ceased. The government spent 6.5% of its annual budget on defense in 2000 and 4.5% of its budget on defense in 2001. It recently acquired some Chinese artillery pieces, some Ukrainian patrol boats, and some Ukrainian helicopter gunships. The number of paved airports in Equatorial Guinea can be counted on one hand, and as such the number of airplanes operated by the air force is small. The Equatoguineans rely on foreigners to operate and maintain this equipment as they are not sufficiently trained to do so. Cooper and Weinert 2010 says that all aircraft are based on the military side of Malabo International Airport.

In 2002, an International Consortium of Investigative Journalists report said:

Equipment

Armour

Small arms

Aircraft
The Equatorial Guinea Air Corps was founded in 1979 with mainly French and Spanish air frames. In 2005, 4 Su 25s including 2 Su-25UB combat trainers were delivered to the Equatorial Guinea Air Corps. The current status of the aircraft is unknown. In 2015 two CASA C-295 (one transport and one surveillance) aircraft were ordered for delivery from September 2016.

Current inventory

Navy 

The Equatorial Guinean main task is to counter piracy and robbery at sea. In July 2010, after the visit of Brazilian president Luiz Inácio Lula da Silva, an order for a Barroso-class corvette was announced. However,  no further news has been announced. On 3 June 2014, the frigate Wele Nzas was commissioned and became the navy's flagship.

Higher education and training
On 6 November 2016, the Zimbabwe Defence Forces deployed a training contingent to the Equatorial Guinea to train the country's military officers on operational and logistic matters following an urgent request by the West African country. The security personnel contingent is composed of members of the Zimbabwe National Army and Air Force of Zimbabwe. In 2018, 28 graduates from the military received diplomas from the Nakhimov Naval Academy in Sevastopol.

Notes

References

Further reading
Cooper, Tom & Weinert, Peter (2010). African MiGs: Volume I: Angola to Ivory Coast. Harpia Publishing LLC. .
Jeremy Binnie, 'Boom Time – Equatorial Guinea,' Jane's Defence Weekly, 30 May 2012.
Рост военно-морской мощи Экваториальной Гвинеи и украинские корни этого роста (The growth of Equatorial Guinea's naval power and the Ukrainian roots of this growth)